J. Christopher Reyes (born 1953) is an American billionaire businessman, and the co-chairman, with his brother Jude Reyes, of  Reyes Holdings, a beer and food distribution holding company, ranked by Forbes in 2022 as the 7th largest privately held company in the US.

Early life
Reyes was born in 1953, the eldest son of Joseph A. Reyes and Frances "Frannie" Marie Reyes (nee Collins) (1925-2013). He has seven brothers and one sister, M. Jude Reyes, David K. Reyes, William F. Reyes, John J. Reyes, James V. Reyes, Julie Reyes Taubman, Thomas A. Reyes, and Stephen Reyes (died before 2013).

Reyes earned a bachelor's degree from the University of Maryland.

Career
He began his business career by purchasing a small Schlitz beer distribution business in Spartanburg, South Carolina with his brother and father. Running all aspects of the operation with his brother, the firm aggressively acquired beer distribution businesses and brands.  Since 1976, Reyes Holdings has acquired more than 130 beer distribution operations. In April 1998, the firm expanded beyond beer distribution with the purchase of the Martin-Brower Company, a dedicated McDonald's distribution business operating primarily in the US and 18 international locations. In 2015, Reyes Holdings expanded into Coca-Cola production and distribution with the acquisition of Great Lakes Coca-Cola Bottling in Chicago and the Midwest. Currently Reyes Holdings runs its Coca-Cola production under Reyes Coca-Cola Bottling with operations in California, Nevada and throughout the Midwest.

Political donations
A Republican, he has donated $25,250 to former Illinois Lieutenant Governor Corinne Wood. From 1994 to 2007, he donated $80,200 to the Illinois Republican Party and the Lake County Republican Party committees. He also donated $100,000 to Two Party System, Inc., a Republican PAC.

Personal life
Reyes is married to Anne N. Reyes, they have four children and live in Hobe Sound, Florida. In 2010, he bought a house with 44 acres in Aspen, Colorado for $47.5 million. In 2022, he was named as the purchaser of the $36 million Driehaus property in Lake Geneva, WI.

Philanthropy 
He is a distinguished lifetime director of Ann and Robert H. Lurie Children's Hospital of Chicago, a director of Northwestern Memorial Healthcare, and a trustee of Ronald McDonald House Charities and the University of Notre Dame.

References

Living people
1954 births
People from Lake Forest, Illinois
University of Maryland, College Park alumni
American billionaires
Businesspeople from Illinois
University of Notre Dame Trustees